Maksim Kavalchuk (born 5 March 2000) is a Belarusian professional footballer who plays for Dinamo Brest.

References

External links 
 
 

2000 births
Living people
Sportspeople from Brest, Belarus
Belarusian footballers
Association football midfielders
FC Dynamo Brest players
FC Energetik-BGU Minsk players